The Alameda Station is a station on Line 2 of the Monterrey Metro. It is located in the intersection of Aramberri street and Cuauhtémoc Avenue in the Monterrey centre. The station was opened on 30 November 1994 as part of the inaugural section of Line 2, between General Anaya and Zaragoza.

This metro station serves the Monterrey centre, and is located one block away from the popular Alameda public park, from which the station takes its name.  It is accessible for people with disabilities.

The logo represents the arches that are in the Parque Alameda.

See also
List of Monterrey metro stations

References

Metrorrey stations
Railway stations opened in 1994
1994 establishments in Mexico
Railway stations located underground in Mexico